The Phenix watch trademark was created in 1873 in Porrentruy, Switzerland.

The Phenix watch was entirely manufactured and assembled on site. This enabled the watchmaker to ensure uniformly high quality and craftsmanship for each watch. In part as a result of this attention to detail, the brand won a number of industry awards, particularly for its Firebird model.

In the 1960s, Phenix became divided into three brands, with the other two brands named, Thomen and Vulcain. The latter was relaunched in 2004.

References

Watch brands